Lysinibacillus varians is a Gram-positive, rod-shaped, spore-forming and motile bacterium from the genus of Lysinibacillus.

References

Bacillaceae
Bacteria described in 2014